The Social Democratic Progress Party (PPSD or PSD) is a Costa Rican political party founded in 2018 and led by Rodrigo Chaves Robles and Pilar Cisneros Gallo.

Background 
The party was created in 2018 by their founder Luz Mary Alpízar Loaiza, formerly part of New Generation Party.

For the 2022 general elections, the party served as the electoral vehicle for the presidential ambitions of Rodrigo Chaves Robles, a recognized economist who worked at the World Bank and who was later called to be Minister of Finance in 2019. His stay as Finance Minister only lasted about a year as a result of irreconcilable conflicts with the then-president Carlos Alvarado Quesada. After this, he had very harsh criticisms of the government's management. In this way, he became a political figure representing those discontented with the PAC government.

He has also been supported by the renowned journalist and political activist Pilar Cisneros Gallo, a critic of corruption and political scandals of different governments throughout the years that she worked in Channel 7 and La Nación, which would end up nominated by this party as deputy for San José.

Ideology 
The party's ideology expresses that they want to lower taxes but maintain sustainable social policies, while helping companies and giving benefits to farmers. It is against monopolies, promotes improvements in the prices of the basic basket products such as rice and is against unnecessary paperwork and bureaucracy in institutions. As such, it advocates reducing public spending by closing unnecessary institutions.

In the social and environmental sphere, Chaves affirms that his government will seek better unemployment plans with more competitive tourism, affirms that he is not against the legalization of marijuana since it brings economic and social benefits, but he affirms that he has an unfavorable perception of the decriminalization of abortion.

Electoral performance

Presidential

Parliamentary

References 

Conservative parties in Costa Rica
Social conservative parties
Political parties in Costa Rica
Political parties established in 2020
Liberal parties in Costa Rica
Social democratic parties